Grant Township is one of eleven townships in Benton County, Indiana. As of the 2020 census, its population was 1,085 and it contained 470 housing units. It was organized in December 1868 and was named for Ulysses Grant.

Geography

Cities and towns
 Boswell

Unincorporated towns
 Chase

Adjacent townships
 Center (northeast)
 Hickory Grove (west)
 Oak Grove (east)
 Parish Grove (northwest)
 Pine Township, Warren County (southeast)
 Prairie Township, Warren County (southwest)

Major highways
  U.S. Route 41
  State Road 352

Cemeteries
The township contains three cemeteries: Boswell, Perigo and Smith.

Education
 Benton Community School Corporation

References

Citations

Sources
 
 United States Census Bureau cartographic boundary files

External links

 Indiana Township Association
 United Township Association of Indiana

Townships in Benton County, Indiana
Lafayette metropolitan area, Indiana
Townships in Indiana
1868 establishments in Indiana